Elizabeth was launched at Lancaster in 1798. She made five complete voyages as a slave ship in the triangular trade in enslaved people. Spanish privateers captured her in 1805 while she was on her sixth slave voyage after she had embarked slaves.

Career 
Elizabeth first appeared in Lloyd's Register (LR), in 1798.

Captain Henry Bond acquired a letter of marque on 19 March 1798.

1st slave voyage (1798–1799): Captain Charles Kneal acquired a letter of marque on 9 October 1798. Captain Kneale sailed on 12 November. He acquired slaves at Bonny and arrived at Martinique on 26 July 1799 with 455 slaves. Elizabeth left Martinique on 31 August and arrived back at Liverpool on 12 October. She had left on her voyage with 53 crew members and she had suffered nine crew deaths on her voyage.

2nd slave voyage (1800–1801): Captain John Mill acquired a letter of marque on 1 March 1800. He acquired slaves at Iles de Los and sailed from there on 20 September. Elizabeth arrived at Suriname on 7 November with 313 slaves. She sailed from Suriname on 15 February 1801 and arrived at Liverpool on 20 April. She had left the United Kingdom with 3 crew members and had suffered 34 crew deaths on her voyage.

3rd slave voyage (1801–1802): Captain James Giles acquired a letter of marque on 26 May 1801. He sailed on 4 June 1801 and acquired slaves first on the Gold Coast, and then at Bonny. Elizabeth arrived at Demerara on 25 December. She arrived back at Liverpool on 7 June 1802. she had left the United Kingdom with 49 crew members and had suffered four crew deaths on her voyage.

4th slave voyage (1802–1803): Because he sailed during the Peace of Amiens, Giles did not sail with a letter of marque. He sailed on 6 August 1802 and acquired slaves at Cape Coast Castle. Elizabeth sailed from Africa on 6 February 1803 and arrived at Demerara in March. She sailed from Demerara on 20 April and arrived back at Liverpool on 31 May.

5th slave voyage (1804–1803): When Captain Giles sailed again, war with France had resumed. He acquired a letter of marque on 10 January 1804. He sailed from Liverpool on 26 January and acquired slaves at Bonny. Elizabeth left Africa on 24 May and arrived at Havana on 22 July with 334 slaves. She sailed from Havana on 18 September and arrived back at Liverpool on 2 November. She had left Liverpool with 45 crew members and had suffered eight crew deaths on her voyage.

6th slave voyage (1805–loss): Captain Samuel Hensley acquired a letter of marque on 9 January 1805. He sailed from Liverpool on 29 January.

The privateer had "Swift of Norfolk" painted on her stern and was armed with twenty 24-pounder carronades on her main deck and lighter guns on her quarterdeck. ''Elizabeth had one man killed and six wounded, and suffered extensive damage. 

She acquired slaves at the Congo River and sailed from there on 14 August.

Fate

Elizabeth and Nelly were among the seven vessels off the Congo River that had fallen prey to a privateer. The privateer was described as being of 22 guns and 350 men. Nellys captor sent her to the River Plate. A second report named the captors as L'Orient, of 14 guns, and Dromedario, of 22 guns. The captured vessels arrived in the River Plate before 12 November. Elizabeth arrived at Montevideo on 17 October with 128 enslaved people.

Spanish records report that in June 1805, Viceroy Sobremonte, of Argentina, issued two letters of marque, one for Dolores (24 guns), Currand, master, and Berro y Errasquin, owner, and one for Dromedario (20 guns), Hippolito Mordel, master, and Canuerso y Masini, owner. The two sailed for the African coast, looking to capture enslaving ships. In three months of cruising Dolores captured three ships and one brig, carrying a total 600 enslaved people. Dromedario captured five ships, carrying a total of 500 enslaved people.

In 1805, 30 British slave ships were lost. Thirteen were lost on the coast of Africa. During the period 1793 to 1807, war, rather than maritime hazards or slave resistance, was the greatest cause of vessel losses among British slave vessels.

Notes

Citations

References
  
 

1798 ships
Age of Sail merchant ships of England
Liverpool slave ships
Captured ships